The Roman Catholic Diocese of Sokoto is a diocese located in the city of Sokoto in the Ecclesiastical province of Kaduna in Nigeria.  Its territory includes the states of Sokoto, Zamfara, Kebbi, and Katsina.

History
 June 29, 1953: Established as Apostolic Prefecture of Sokoto from the Apostolic Prefecture of Kaduna
 June 16, 1964: Promoted as Diocese of Sokoto

Special churches
The Cathedral is Holy Family Cathedral in Sokoto.

Bishops
 Prefect Apostolic of Sokoto (Roman rite) 
 Father Edward Thaddeus Lawton, O.P. (1954.01.15 – 1964.06.16 see below)
 Bishops of Sokoto (Roman rite)
 Bishop Edward Thaddeus Lawton, O.P. (see above 1964.06.16 – 1966.12.19)
 Bishop Michael James Dempsey, O.P. (1967.07.13 – 1984.12.03)
 Bishop Kevin Joseph Aje (1984.12.03 – 2011.06.10)
 Bishop Matthew Hassan Kukah (since 2011.06.10)

Coadjutor bishop
 Kevin Joseph Aje (1982-1984)

Persecution
Situated in the North of Nigeria, in a Muslim-majority atmosphere, there have been incidents of persecution in Sokoto against Christians and Catholics in particular. In May 2022, following the lynching of Deborah Yakubu, there was violence against other Christian sites, according to a statement released by the Catholic Diocese of Sokoto. "During the protest, groups of youths led by some adults in the background attacked the Holy Family Catholic Cathedral at Bello Way, destroying church glass windows, those of the Bishop Lawton Secretariat, and vandalized a community bus parked within the premises. St. Kevin’s Catholic Church was also attacked and partly burnt; windows of the new hospital complex under construction, in the same premises, were shattered. The hoodlums also attacked the Bakhita Centre […], burning down a bus within the premises.”

In 2022 two Catholic priests were kidnapped, and later released, in the diocese. Their names are Fr Stephen Ojapah and Fr. Oliver Okpara.

See also
Roman Catholicism in Nigeria

References

Sources
 GCatholic.org Information
 Catholic Hierarchy
Nigerian Catholic Diocesan Priests Association page about Sokoto Diocese 
Dominican Sisters in Gusau, Zamfara State, Nigeria

Roman Catholic dioceses in Nigeria
Christian organizations established in 1953
Roman Catholic dioceses and prelatures established in the 20th century
Roman Catholic Ecclesiastical Province of Kaduna
1953 establishments in Nigeria